Camille Guérini (29 June 1900 – 15 April 1963) was a French film and television actor.

Selected filmography

 La Chanson du souvenir (1937) - Veit, l'ordonnance
 The Blue Veil (1942) - d'Aubigny
 Les ailes blanches (1943) - (uncredited)
 Des jeunes filles dans la nuit (1943)
 Madame et le mort (1943) - L'organisateur
 Vingt-cinq ans de bonheur (1943)
 Monsieur des Lourdines (1943) - Nestor
 The Island of Love (1944)
 La Grande Meute (1945) - La Ramée
 Song of the Clouds (1946)
 Impasse (1946)
 The Room Upstairs (1946) - Gardin - le facteur
 Les Amants du pont Saint-Jean (1947) - Le brigadier de gendarmerie
 Two Loves (1949) - Le régisseur
 Jean de la Lune (1949) - L'avoué
 La Marie du port (1950) - Le vendeur (uncredited)
 Lady Paname (1950) - Auguste Bosset
 Justice Is Done (1950) - Le représentant en meubles (uncredited)
 Paris Vice Squad (1951) - Le commissaire Husson, de la Mondaine
 Victor (1951) - Gratien
 Alone in Paris (1951) - Ernest Milliard
 Matrimonial Agency (1952) - Le commandant
 Imperial Violets (1952) - Le docteur (uncredited)
 It Happened in Paris (1952) - Le père de la petite fille
 Their Last Night (1953) - Monsieur Malafosse
 Stain in the Snow (1954) - Le commissaire
 Leguignon guérisseur (1954) - Un malade
 Les Diaboliques (1955) - Le photographe
 Gas-Oil (1955) - Lucien Ragondin
 Marguerite de la nuit (1955)
 Deadlier Than the Male (1956) - Gégène, le clochard
 Marie Antoinette Queen of France (1956) - Necker
 Le pays d'où je viens (1956)
 The Hunchback of Notre Dame (1956) - The President
 Sénéchal the Magnificent (1957) - Le restaurateur (uncredited)
 Mademoiselle et son gang (1957) - Un habitué de l'hôtel (uncredited)
 Les Espions (1957) - M. Bargeot, le bistrot (uncredited)
 L'amour est en jeu (1957)
 Le septième ciel (1958) - (uncredited)
 Sins of Youth (1958) - Le curé
 Maigret et l'Affaire Saint-Fiacre (1959) - Gaultier - le régisseur
 Dialogue with the Carmelites (1960) - Docteur Javeline, le médecin du Carmel
 The Seventh Juror (1962) - Judge
 Gigot (1962) - Priest
 Le masque de fer (1962)
 Tartarin de Tarascon (1962) - Victor Bombonnel
 Le glaive et la balance (1963) - Le juge Noblet (final film role)

References

Bibliography
 Melissa E. Biggs. French films, 1945-1993: a critical filmography of the 400 most important releases. McFarland & Company, 1996.

External links

1900 births
1963 deaths
French male stage actors
French male film actors
People from Lorient